Lukáš Bielák (born 14 December 1986) is a Slovak footballer who plays as a centre-back.

Club career
On 5 October 2020, he joined GKS Jastrzębie on loan.

References

External links
 
  
 

1986 births
Living people
Slovak footballers
Association football midfielders
MFK Ružomberok players
MFK Tatran Liptovský Mikuláš players
Górnik Łęczna players
Bytovia Bytów players
ŁKS Łódź players
Stal Mielec players
GKS Jastrzębie players
Slovak Super Liga players
Ekstraklasa players
I liga players
II liga players
III liga players
Slovak expatriate footballers
Expatriate footballers in Poland
Sportspeople from Ružomberok